William Maxwell, 5th Earl of Nithsdale (16762 March 1744), was a Scottish Catholic nobleman who took part in the Jacobite rising of 1715. He was attainted with his titles forfeited. However, Lord Nithsdale made a celebrated escape from the Tower of London by changing clothes with his wife's maid the day before he was due to be executed. The lordship of Herries of Terregles was later restored to his descendants and remains extant.

Early life

He was the eldest son of Robert, fourth Earl of Nithsdale (1627/28–1683), and Lady Lucie Douglas (died 1713), daughter of William, eleventh earl of Angus and first Marquess of Douglas. He was probably born at Terregles Castle, near Dumfries. The early death of his father ensured that he was raised by his mother, the Dowager Countess, who educated him to be a faithful and conventionally devout Roman Catholic and a partisan of the Stuart cause.

Jacobite supporter

On reaching the age of 21, in 1697, and becoming earl, he secretly visited the Jacobite court at Saint-Germain to give his allegiance to the exiled King James II and VII, where he met his future wife Lady Winifred Herbert, daughter of the Duke of Powis. After their marriage at Saint-Germain in 1699, they settled at his family seat at Terregles. As a prominent Catholic in the predominantly Covenanting Lowlands, he was on a number of occasions the object of Presbyterian assaults on his estate, on suspicion of harbouring Jesuits.

Despite his discretion, he was long suspected of Jacobite sympathies. In 1712 he resigned his estate to his son William (died 1776), reserving a life rent to himself. In the Jacobite rising of 1715, after some hesitation, he proclaimed James III and VIII at Dumfries and Jedburgh, before joining the main Jacobite forces at Hexham under General Thomas Forster. Nithsdale was captured at Preston together with other Jacobite leaders, sent to London, tried and found guilty of treason, and sentenced to death on 9 February 1716.

His devoted countess Winifred, who was at their home in Terregles (near Dumfries) when she heard of the capture of her husband travelled to London and appealed in vain for a pardon. Instead, she laid a meticulous plan to rescue him from the Tower of London. The night before the day appointed for his execution (24 February 1716), with the help of two other Jacobite ladies, she effected his escape from the Tower. She had been admitted to his room, and by exchanging clothes with his wife's maid, he escaped the attention of his guards. He fled to France, while the countess returned to Scotland to ensure the transfer of the estate to their son. She joined him in Paris and they went to Rome, where they lived, attached to the court of James Stuart, the Pretender, until his death.

In Literature

The story of the Earl of Nithsdale's escape from the Tower of London inspired James Hogg's Ballad of the Lord Maxwell first published in the Royal Lady's Magazine in October 1831.

References

|-

1676 births
1744 deaths
William
5th Earl of Nithsdale
Escapees from England and Wales detention
Lords Herries of Terregles
People of the Jacobite rising of 1715
Prisoners in the Tower of London
Scottish escapees
Scottish Jacobites
Scottish Roman Catholics